Nicholas Range may refer to:

Nicholas Range (Antarctic), a mountain range in Antarctic
Nicholas Range (Pamir Mountains), a mountain range on the border of Afghanistan and Tajikistan